William Pierron was a Republican member of the Wisconsin State Assembly from Milwaukee for two terms (1881 and 1891).

References

Politicians from Milwaukee
Republican Party members of the Wisconsin State Assembly